Wormstein was a 5-man band who released their only single on 23 April 2015. It was believed that the members consisted of those from Australian band 5 Seconds of Summer and John Feldman. This was not confirmed until an article was released where Luke Hemmings confirmed that Wormstein consisted of the 5SOS members.

References

Australian punk rock groups